Aniwave was an annual one day anime convention held during December at the Wilmington Convention Center in Wilmington, North Carolina.

Programming
The convention typically offered a costume contest, demonstrations, panels, vendors, and workshops.

History
Aniwave was founded in 2007 by artist Michal Wisniowski as a free film festival held at the Cameron Art Museum and Jengo's Playhouse. The convention moved to a larger venue in 2010, the Wilmington Convention Center, and had new leadership due to Michal Wisniowski moving away.

Event history

Film Festivals

References

External links
Aniwave official website

Defunct anime conventions
Recurring events established in 2007
2007 establishments in North Carolina
Annual events in North Carolina
Festivals in North Carolina
Tourist attractions in New Hanover County, North Carolina
Wilmington, North Carolina